Thomas Ford Badon (December 3, 1922 – May 21, 2015) was an American lawyer and politician who served in the Mississippi House of Representatives and as a town alderman in Liberty, Mississippi.

References

External links
 

Democratic Party members of the Mississippi House of Representatives
1922 births
2015 deaths
University of Mississippi alumni
University of Mississippi School of Law alumni
20th-century American politicians